Justin Walker is a fictional character on the ABC television series Brothers & Sisters. He is played by actor Dave Annable. In a 2010 episode, actor Dylan Larsen portrayed Justin as a young child in flashback sequences set in 1986.

Character history

Background
Justin is the youngest child of Nora and William Walker. Born in 1982, he was an unexpected pregnancy and is considerably younger than the rest of the Walker family and often feels over-protected by his parents and siblings as a result. When Justin was in his early teens, a family friend named Tucker Booth introduced him to drugs. After September 11, when Kitty returned from New York to stay with her family, she confides to Justin her experiences and fears stemming from that catastrophic event. It was for these reasons that he was compelled to join the Army. When he returned from Afghanistan, he suffered from posttraumatic stress disorder, leading to his drug addiction. Nora blamed Kitty for encouraging Justin to join the army, leading to their estrangement.

The black sheep

Justin spent much of his time getting high up north with his buddies and spending little time doing anything else in his youth. The closest thing in his life to a relationship was with a fellow aimless drug addict named Fawn. One day while visiting his father at Ojai Foods (the family company), Justin saw his father talking to a mysterious woman - Holly Harper. After his father's death, Justin saw her again making a brief appearance at the funeral. He tracked her down and asked her how she knew his father; Holly told him they'd been lovers for years. To make matters worse, his father's will stipulated that Justin's inheritance would  go in a conservatorship due to his worry that he would blow it all on drugs and alcohol, with Kitty as the conservator. Justin was humiliated, didn't show up for his job at a restaurant, and wasn't heard from until the next day when Nora got a call that he'd been picked up by the police. Nora, Kevin, and Kitty got him out of jail, but he bristled at Nora telling him how disappointed William would be in him.

Despite his problems, Justin  has redeeming characteristics. But he had his own serious issues. He continued taking prescription painkillers, like Oxycodone and Vicodin, for his posttraumatic stress disorder, nearly costing him another job (as a bell boy). His boss was a young woman named Tyler, whom he knew casually in high school. They began dating.

Also, when Justin's brother Tommy found out he was sterile and asked Kevin to be a sperm donor, for his wife Julia, Kevin initially refused, so Justin said he'd be a donor. Tommy said he didn't want Justin to be a donor, since he wasn't reliable and used drugs. Justin was hurt but eventually Tommy changed his mind. Both Kevin and Justin were donors, and agreed they would never find out who the father was.

Iraq and drug use

At this point, things were looking up for Justin. Unfortunately, he got orders to go to Iraq. He was so devastated by the news that he relapsed, badly, and overdosed. He also ruined his relationship with Tyler, as she had seen him with Fawn on a drug high and told him she didn't want to deal with his behavior (she didn't know about his learning he had to go to Iraq). With Kevin's help, Justin was given a reprieve for six months, as long as he went to rehab.

His former boss and girlfriend, Tyler, returned after Justin cleaned up his drug habit. He ran into her when she was with her new boyfriend for a Valentine's Day dinner. He apologized to her for his past behavior, and she decided to give their relationship another go. They were happy together briefly, but soon he decided that until he dealt with all his problems, he shouldn't put another person through what he was dealing with.

Eventually, the time came for Justin to return to active duty. Justin wanted to ship out to Iraq without letting his family know, so he slipped away from his sister, Kitty's, engagement party informing only Rebecca. Rebecca told Kitty and Nora and they rushed to the airport for a tearful goodbye.

Several months later, Justin returned from Iraq with a leg injury. He suffered from tremendous pain, but refused to take meds because of his history as an addict. Eventually, after strong pressure, Nora convinced him to start taking pain medication, to which he became addicted once more.

Rebecca

Justin found out that he had a half-sister, Rebecca Harper, the product of William and Holly. Most of the Walkers were hesitant about how to deal with this new relation, but Justin went to visit her as soon as he learned of her existence. She helped him steer clear of drugs and he ardently defended her when she said Sarah's husband made a pass at her.

Justin later had an inkling that Rebecca may not, in fact, be his sister. She took a paternity test and told him that she was his sister, to his relief. This relief was short-lived however, as he began to develop what could only be called "inappropriate" feelings for her - of a romantic nature. He told  his brother Kevin about it and Kevin told him to stay away from her, which he did. But eventually, he told her his feelings and she "freaked out". The day after, he apologized to her. She then revealed to him that she was not actually his half-sister, but the daughter of David Caplan. He became very angry at her about this and immediately told his mother, and as a result, the rest of the Walker family. In the season 2 season finale, they made amends and he asked if they could start over. Later, they met at a hill and she told him she believed all the craziness was supposed to lead her to him and they shared their first kiss. In season 4 Justin misses their wedding rehearsal over the stress of med school and becoming a father. He witnesses a small boy being hit by a car and comes to the boy's aid. He then realizes how much he wants to be a husband and a father, and he later tells an upset Rebecca what happened and professes his love to her. She says the wedding is back on however it is interrupted when Kitty collapses, Kitty is fine after getting a bone marrow transplant from Ryan but Rebecca miscarries the baby, putting a toll on their relationship. Later Rebecca and Justin elope and spend their honeymoon at the Ojai Ranch.

Medical school

Justin, after Robert's heart situation, told Rebecca that he wanted to become a doctor in the first place. In the next episodes we see him applying for a series of universities, and he even got a recommendation letter from Robert. Later we see that he was accepted.
In Pregnant Pause he gets his midfinals mailed to him and discovers he's on academic probation. Rebecca later helps Justin realize that the reason he has so much trouble in school may be caused by dyslexia.

Homecoming

In the start of season 5, Justin returns from the army to find that Rebecca has moved out and reveals to the Walkers that they divorced because Justin went back to the army blaming himself for not saving Robert, leaving Rebecca to deal with the problems of her mother on her own. They later come to an understanding. Justin and Rebecca love each other but she goes to New York after being offered a photography job. Justin also begins dating a nurse, Annie and starts working as a paramedic. However, after performing a procedure to inflate a man's lung to keep him from dying Justin discovers that it could lead him to a suspension. But Annie's ex-boyfriend Dr. Rick bails him out and Justin gets in a fight with him during a staff baseball game and breaks up with Annie, telling her that he doesn't think she's over Dr. Rick.

Later Justin meets Zach, an ex-marine, living on the streets and takes it upon himself to help him sort out his life by letting him stay in his house and getting him a job in Scotty's restaurant. It soon becomes clear after spending his time trying to help everyone else that Justin needs to focus on sorting out his own life and Zach moves out thanking Justin for what he has done. When he and Luc check bookings at a hotel for Luc's cousins visiting for his bachelor party Justin bumps into his old love Tyler. Justin asks if she would like to meet up and although he is hesitant at first Tyler explains that she is married but separated. Justin opens up about his own divorce and the two share a kiss.

External links
Press release for Brothers & Sisters

Brothers & Sisters characters
Fictional American Jews
Fictional characters from Los Angeles
Fictional Iraq War veterans